Villeron is a commune in the Val-d'Oise department in Île-de-France in northern France.

The town is bordered by Louvres, Puiseux-en-France, Marly-la-Ville, Survilliers, Vémars and Chennevières-lès-Louvres.

See also
Communes of the Val-d'Oise department

References

External links

Association of Mayors of the Val d'Oise 

Communes of Val-d'Oise